New Hope Village District, also known as New Hope M.R.A. District No. 1, is a national historic district located in New Hope, Bucks County, Pennsylvania.  The district includes 202 contributing buildings in the borough of New Hope. They are primarily residential and commercial buildings, some of which date to the early-18th century.  They include notable example of the Late Victorian and Federal styles.  Notable buildings include the Parry Mansion (1784), Bucks County Playhouse, Wilkinson House, Logan Inn (1727), Delaware House (1818), Chattels Lumber Yard Office Building (c. 1845), Cook House (1869), Johnson Store (c. 1871), Northeast Pennsylvania Railroad Station (1891), firehouse (1908), and Cryer Hardware Store (1849). The Northeast Pennsylvania Railroad Station is used as a terminus for the New Hope and Ivyland Railroad.

It was added to the National Register of Historic Places in 1985.

References

Historic districts in Bucks County, Pennsylvania
Federal architecture in Pennsylvania
Victorian architecture in Pennsylvania
Historic districts on the National Register of Historic Places in Pennsylvania
National Register of Historic Places in Bucks County, Pennsylvania